Jorge Romero Sáez (born 15 December 1984) is a Spanish football manager, who is currently in charge of UCAM Murcia CF.

Managerial career
Born in Córdoba, Andalusia, Romero joined Córdoba CF in 2009, from Don Bosco CF. Initially in charge of the youth setup, he was included in the first team staff during the 2012–13 season.

On 1 March 2017, Romero was appointed manager of the reserve team in Segunda División B. After avoiding relegation, he signed a new three-year contract with the club on 7 June.

On 4 December 2017, Romero replaced fired Juan Merino at the helm of the main squad in Segunda División. His first professional match occurred six days later, a 2–2 home draw against Rayo Vallecano.

On 12 February 2018, Romero was sacked following a 1–5 heavy loss against CD Tenerife. On 9 July 2019, after more than a year without coaching, he was appointed manager of AD Alcorcón's B-team in Tercera División.

In July 2020, Romero joined Real Madrid CF to become a coach of Real Madrid Juvenil A side. He returned to Alkor and its B-side on 19 July 2021, but was named at the helm of the main squad on 18 September after Juan Antonio Anquela was sacked.

On 2 November 2021, after only seven matches at the helm of the first team, Romero himself was dismissed as head coach.

Managerial statistics

References

External links

1984 births
Living people
Sportspeople from Córdoba, Spain
Spanish football managers
Segunda División managers
Segunda División B managers
Segunda Federación managers
Tercera División managers
Tercera Federación managers
Córdoba CF managers
AD Alcorcón managers
UCAM Murcia CF managers
Real Madrid CF non-playing staff
Córdoba CF B managers